Grenada competed in the Olympic Games for the first time at the 1984 Summer Olympics in Los Angeles, United States. It was the nation's first appearance at the Olympics. The youngest participant for Grenada was Emrol Phillip (18 years, 34 days) while the oldest was Christopher "Chris" Collins (24 years, 192 days)

Results by event

Athletics
Women's Long Jump
Jacinta Bartholomew
 Qualification — 6.07 m (→ did not advance, 17th place)

Men's 800m
Samuel Sawny
 Heats;  1:53.08(→ did not advance )

Boxing

Grenada sent four boxers to the Olympic boxing tournament.

References

Official Olympic Reports
sports-reference

Nations at the 1984 Summer Olympics
1984
Olympics